The Italy–Latin America Conference or Italo–Latin America Conference, formally the Italy–Latin America and Caribbean Conference, is an inter-governmental forum for encounter between Italy and the countries of Latin America. A biennial summit is organised in Italy by the "Italo-Latin American Institute" located in Rome, with many initiatives marking the "preparatory path". The institute's aims are to develop and coordinate research and documentation regarding the problems, achievements and prospects of its Member Countries in cultural, scientific, economic, technical and social contexts. The conferences are an effective and well-established policy instrument in Italy’s relations with the countries of Latin America and the Caribbean.

Italy's presence in the region is marked by a large number of people of Italian origin living in Brazil, Argentina, Uruguay, Mexico, Venezuela, Paraguay, Peru, Chile and Bolivia. Italy, being the host nation of the Roman Catholic Church (to which a majority of Italians and Latin Americans belong) and a country with large investments in Latin America, especially in the energy field, has important historical, cultural, and economic ties to Central and South America. There is also a strong collaboration between Italy and nations such as Colombia and Mexico in combating drug trafficking and organized crime, due to links between the Italian mafias and criminal organizations (such as drug cartels) in the Americas. Italy and some Latin American countries (Mexico, Brazil, Argentina) are part of the G8+5 and of the G20. As a founding and leading state of the European Union, Italy has historically a particularly active role in strengthening the partnership between Latin America and Europe. The Italian linguistic, cultural, juridical, architectural, and musical traditions have become an integral part of the national identity of many Latin American countries. Two nations, Colombia and Venezuela, are named after the Italian explorer Christopher Columbus and the Italian city Venice respectively, while Latin America itself is indirectly named after the Italic language Latin and the Italian explorer Amerigo Vespucci. The Latin America term was coined in the 19th century to emphasize the common heritage of the three Romance-speaking areas of the Americas, namely Spanish, Portuguese, and French (see Latin America § Etymology and definitions).

See also
 Organization of Ibero-American States
 Latin Union

References

External links
 Italy-Latin America Conference

Organisations based in Rome
Foreign relations of Italy
Latin America